Mandaluyong El Tigre, also known as Mandaluyong El Tigre-Dataland was a professional basketball team in the Maharlika Pilipinas Basketball League (MPBL).

History
They joined MPBL during the 2017 season. They named the team El Tigre, for Mandaluyong's moniker is "Tiger City".

Roster

Head coaches

All-time roster

 JP Alabanza (2018–present)
 Mark Andaya (2018–present)
 Cris Angelo Espinosa (reserved)
 Jefferson Enrile (reserved)
 Jeff Javillonar (2018–present)
 Martin Jorge (reserved)
 Bobby Ray Parks Jr. (2018–present)
 Prince Rivero (2018–present)
 Thomas Torres (2018–present)

Season-by-season records
Records from the 2021 MPBL Invitational:

References

2018 establishments in the Philippines
Basketball teams established in 2018
Maharlika Pilipinas Basketball League teams
Basketball teams disestablished in 2019
Sport in Mandaluyong
Sports teams in Metro Manila
2019 disestablishments in the Philippines